A comes was an ancient Roman title.

Comes or COMES may also refer to:

Religion
 An acolyth
 The Comes or Liber Comicus, one of the liturgical books of the Roman Rite

Music
An appearance of a fugue subject, the first appearance being dux, the second comes
Comes, the following melody in a canon.

Other uses
 Marcellinus Comes (died  534), chronicler of the Roman Empire
 The fainter star in a binary (double) star system.
 COMES, a French organisation